The Knight-Wallace Fellowship (previously known as the NEH Journalism Fellowship and the Michigan Journalism Fellowship) is an award given to accomplished journalists at the University of Michigan. Knight-Wallace Fellowships are awarded to reporters, editors, photographers, producers, editorial writers and cartoonists, with at least five years of full-time, professional experience in the news media.

The fellows attend mandatory seminars   twice weekly, and each fellow pursues an independent study plan which involves auditing University of Michigan classes and working with a faculty advisor. International travel is an important part of the fellowship, with annual trips to Argentina, Brazil, and Turkey.

Fellows are given a stipend of $70,000, paid in monthly installments from September to April. The fellowship home is at the Wallace House in Ann Arbor, Michigan.

History 
The Michigan Journalism Fellows program, funded by National Endowment for the Humanities and modeled on Harvard's Nieman Fellowship, was established in 1973. The founding director was  Ben L. Yablonky (1910–1991), a labor activist and University of Michigan journalism professor (as well as a former Nieman Fellow). The fellowship program was initially run out of the University of Michigan journalism department. In 1979, the journalism department was disbanded, and the fellowship was moved to the auspices of the university's Literature, Science and Art department. At this point, the program was known as Journalists in Residence.

In 1980, Graham B. Hovey (1916–2010), a former New York Times journalist, succeeded Jablonky as program director, serving until 1986. (The program hosts an annual lecture named in Hovey's honor and delivered by a former fellow; 2015 was the 30th Graham Hovey Lecture.) From 1984–2001, the program was again known as the Michigan Journalism Fellowship.

Charles R. Eisendrath, a former fellowship recipient (1974–1975) and Time magazine staff writer, had joined the University of Michigan's faculty after his fellowship, directing its master’s program in journalism. In 1981 he became founding director of the Livingston Awards, also run out of the University of Michigan. In 1984, Eisendrath joined a committee (led by the John S. and James L. Knight Foundation) to increase the program's endowment, which was gradually losing its NEH support under the presidency of Ronald Reagan. Eisendrath took over as program director in 1986 upon Hovey's retirement. At that point the program's endowment was down to $30,000. The Washington Posts publisher, Katharine Graham, was an early donor, as was the Knight Foundation. Eisendrath also recruited the assistance of renowned journalist (and University of Michigan alumnus) Mike Wallace, who became an active proponent of and financial donor to the program. In 1992, Wallace and his wife Mary donated the Arts and Crafts-era Wallace House to the program, which became its headquarters, and in 1995, Wallace gave the program $1 million. Wallace made regular appearances at Wallace House, giving seminars and meeting with fellows, until shortly before his death in 2012. By this time, the fellowship was being administered by the University's Horace H. Rackham School of Graduate Studies.

Before becoming fully endowed the program would travel to Toronto and meet with the Massey College Journalism fellows, to Chicago to meet with Chicago Tribune journalists, and to Atlanta to visit CNN.  The program began traveling to Buenos Aires, Argentina, in 2000, and added a component in São Paulo, Brazil, in 2009. An annual trip to Istanbul, Turkey, was added in 2005. (In 2009 and 2010 the program went to Moscow, Russia; instead of Istanbul.) In 2013 a trip to Alberta, Canada, became part of the program.

In 2002, the Knight Foundation awarded a $5 million challenge to the program, establishing fellowships for international journalists (which usually include journalists from Argentina's Clarín and Brazil's Folha de S. Paulo, in exchange for their organization's hosting work on the fellowship trips). Mike Wallace provided $1 million in matching funds, and the program was renamed the Knight-Wallace Fellowship.

Since 2012, the fellowship has been administered by the University Provost's office. Its current endowment is $60 million, with a yearly operating cost of about $2.3 million.

In 2015, the fellowship program and the Livingston Awards were rebranded as Wallace House'''.

In October 2015, after nearly 30 years as director, KWF director Charles R. Eisendrath announced his retirement, effective July 1, 2016. A search committee led by journalist Ken Auletta and University of Michigan Engineering professor Thomas Zurbuchen selected his replacement. In April 2016, former KWF fellow (2009) Lynette Clemetson was named next director of Wallace House.Silberman, Eve. "Lynette Clemetson: The new face of Wallace House," Ann Arbor Observer (July 2017).

 Program structure 
Between 18 and 20 fellowships are awarded annually; generally 12 to Americans and 6 to 8 to foreign journalists. (Relationships with the BBC, Argentina's newspaper Clarín, Brazil's Folha de S. Paulo'', and South Korea's Shinyoung Journalism Fund of the Kwanhun Club guarantee international fellows from the above newspapers.)

Specific fellowships include:
 David B. Burke Fellowship in General Studies
 Time Warner Fellowship for Minority Journalists
 Mike Wallace Fellowship in Investigative Reporting
 Benjamin R. Burton Fellowship in Broadcast Journalism
 Ford Fellowship in Transportation Technology and Environment
 Karsten Prager Fellowship in International Reporting
 Benny Friedman Fellowship in Sports Journalism
 William C. Richardson Fellowship for Public Policy and Philanthropy
 Knight Specialty Reporting Fellowships
 Business/Economics — co-funded by the University of Michigan's Ross School of Business
 Education
 Law — co-funded by the University of Michigan Law School
 Medicine/Health Sciences — co-funded by the University of Michigan Medical Center

While the program initially limited its fellowships to full-time salaried journalists, in the 2010s, as the journalism industry went through so many changes, it increasingly began opening its doors to freelancers.

The program specifies that funders have no input on the selection of the endowed fellowships.

Current Knight-Wallace board members include Jill Abramson, Jeff Fager, Charles Gibson (1974), Clarence Page, and Michele Norris. Former board members include Mike Wallace and David E. Davis.

Stipend 
In 2000, fellows received a stipend of $40,000.

In 2003 and 2004, fellows received a $55,000 stipend.

Currently, the annual stipend is $70,000 plus university tuition and health insurance.

Notable Knight-Wallace Fellows 

 Charles Gibson (1974) — broadcast television anchor and journalist 
 Jim Russell (1974) — radio producer
 Henry Allen (1976) — Pulitzer Prize-winner for photography criticism
 David Suter (1978) — editorial illustrator
 Barry Bearak (1981) — Pulitzer Prize-winning correspondent
 Frank Browning (1985) — radio correspondent
 Dan Gillmor (1987) — technology writer and columnist
 Gary Pomerantz (1987) — sports reporter
 Russell Carollo (1990) — Pulitzer Prize-winning investigative journalist
 Holman W. Jenkins, Jr. (1992) — columnist and editorial writer
 Michael Vitez (1995) — Pulitzer Prize-winning journalist and author
 Dan Froomkin (1996) — Washington correspondent and blogger
 Tom Stanton (1996) — nonfiction author and editor 
 Mike Baker (2000) — BBC writer and presenter
 John U. Bacon (2005) — sports and business commentator
 Faye Flam (2005) — science writer
 Gerard Ryle (2006) — ICIJ Director
 Elena Milashina (2009) Russian investigative journalist for Novaya Gazeta.
 Richard Deitsch (2009) — sports reporter and sports media critic
 Harry Siegel (2011) — editor and editorial writer
 Amber Hunt (2012) — journalist and true-crime author
 Nick Perry (2012) — Pulitzer Prize-winning journalist and author
 Kate Brooks (2013) — photojournalist
 Donovan Hohn (2013) — author and essayist
 Josh Neufeld (2013) — comics journalist
Bastian Obermayer (2017) — German journalist who first wrote about the Panama Papers
 Azi Paybarah (2018) — New York-based journalist who focuses on local politics

See also 
John S. Knight Fellowship (Stanford)
Knight-Bagehot Fellowship (Columbia)
Nieman Fellowships (Harvard)
Livingston Award
Knight Science Journalism program (Massachusetts Institute of Technology aka KSJ@MIT)
International Center for Journalists Knight International Journalism Fellowships

References

External links

 Out Of The Blue Episode 203 (2010)

American journalism awards
University of Michigan
1973 establishments in Michigan
Journalism fellowships